Hungarian Astronautical Society abbreviated as MANT (Magyar Asztronautikai Társaság) is a non-profit organization focusing on educational and informative activities on space science, founded in 1986. 
The association considers itself a successor of the Astronautical Committee of the association called Scientific Lyceum (Hun. abbr.: TIT), founded in 1956; and the Central Astronautical Section of the Federation of Technological and Sciences Associations (Hun. abbr.: MTESZ). 
Members of the Society are space researchers, other professionals concerned in space related fields and others interested in the interdisciplinary and state-of-the-art uses of outer space.

Hungarian Astronautical Society

Aims 
Main aims of the Society are:
 to recruit people for space research and engineering;
 to use space research and applications to educate about STEM fields like physics, astronomy, biology, studies on (space and flight) medicine, flight technology, meteorology and about other fields related like (space) law, sociology, psychology;
 to develop the independent and team-working skills and creativity of students by organizing youth competitions, group competitions and summer space camps;
 to publicize space research and everyday applications of space not only in public events but also through media relations;
 to keep contact with Hungarian space researchers and engineers working abroad;
 to keep the memory of the great Hungarian pioneers of astronautics;
 to act for Hungary in the International Astronautical Federation (IAF) (member since 1959) and in the International Academy of Astronautics (IAA); representing Hungary at the annual International Astronautical Congress as the only participating Hungarian organization;
 to improve international connections which is even more important since Hungary has become a Member State of the European Space Agency (ESA).

Regular events 
Main regular events of the Society:
 Hungarian Summer Space Camp (since 1994)
 Student Competition (since 1992) 
 The Way to Space! Space contest for Hungarian-speaking high-school students 
 Hungarian Space Academy (since 2015)
 Space Academy Club (since 2014, in February, April, September, November)
 Space Research Day (every fall)
 Hungarian Space Research Forum (biennial, odd years)
 H-SPACE Conference (international conference in English since 2015, biennial, even years)

Publications
 Hungarian Space Studies Annuary, since 1961 HU ISSN 1788-7771
 English-Hungarian Space Dictionary, in cooperation with International Academy of Astronautics (IAA) as contribution to the IAA Multilingual Space Dictionary 
 "Science is Born" (Tudomány születik) – Book of Interviews with Creators of Hungarian Space Studies, 
 "Expanding Borders" (Táguló határok) – Book of Interviews with Hungarian Space Researchers of the '70s and '80s, 
 "Our Space Campers" (Űrtáborosaink) - Book of Interviews with 12 former participants of the Hungarian Space Camp

Hungarian Space Camp

History
The camp was founded by Aunt Magdi, the "Space Granny" in 1994. Her intent was to introduce space research and astronautics to the youth. That time the program of the camp consisted mostly of lectures presented by the best-known Hungarian scientists in the field. Later the camp had a younger leadership, leading to a shift to more active and creative programs. From 2010 the duration of the camp is one week, from Sunday to Saturday. 
The participants are students between the age of 13 and 18, all interested in sciences and space topics. We are proud of the fact that the ratio of the girls among the participants is approaching 50%. About quarter of the students return next year and every fifth student becomes a regular camper. Some acknowledged space researchers started their "space career" in the Space Camp, like two of the Secretary Generals and several Members of Board.

Locations
1994 – Kecskemét, 1995 – Eger, 1996 – Veszprém, 1997 – Veszprém, 1998 – Győr, 1999 – Kecskemét, 2000 – Sopron, 2001 – Debrecen, 2002 – Székesfehérvár, 2003 – Budapest, 2004 – Kiskunhalas, 2005 – Gyulaháza, 2006 – Szentlélek, 2007 – Hollóstető, 2008 – Szentlélek, 2010 – Gyomaendrőd, 2011 – Sátoraljaújhely, 2012 – Kecskemét, 2013 – Alsómocsolád, 2014 – Felsőtárkány, 2015 – Sopron, 2016 – Debrecen, 2017 – Bakonybél, 2018 - Zalaegerszeg, 2019 - Sátoraljaújhely, 2020 - virtual (3-day online event), 2021 - virtual (3-day online event), 2022 - Székesfehérvár (planned)

Student Competition
MANT organizes a competition for primary and secondary school students every year. The topics announced in around October are always different, but focus on a current aspect of space research and exploration.

The students can enter the competition in a variety of ways: by writing an essay, by submitting a drawing, a project plan, a short video, or by solving a list of problems related to the actual topic. Small teams of two or three students are also welcome. The applications are rated in two age categories by experts. The prizes for the best include participation in the Hungarian summer youth space camp for free or for a reduced fee; science books and magazines; a visit to a selected space research institute or company; free one-year membership in our society.

The competition is open for visually impaired students as well. Their works are evaluated separately.

Lectures and Activities
In the camp space researchers and astronautical experts give lectures. Topics cover a wide range, from the basics of astronomy through problems of space debris to deciding the dilemma if Pluto is a planet or not. Other activities include several practical exercises make the camp exciting, e.g. water rocketry, underwater assembly, creating stereo pictures, astronomical observation, excursions, bathing, etc.  There is a main topic every year which meets the topic of the Student Competition.

Mentor Program
Since 2015 private individuals and companies are invited to co-finance the Hungarian Space Camp as Mentors. MANT welcomes financial support of participation of needy students from Hungary and from the Hungarian diaspora in the surrounding countries. In the past years about one fifth of the participants was able to join the Camp by favor of a Mentor.

Student competition
MANT yearly announces a Student Competition for primary and secondary school students, since 1992. The topics announced around October are always different, but focus on a current aspect of space research and exploration. The topic of the Student Competition is going to be the main topic of the Space Camp of that year. E.g. title of the Competition was "Civilians in Space" in 2014, "Beyond Mars" in 2015 and "Cleaning in Space" in 2017.
Categories: writing essay; drawing; preparing project plan; creating video, website, Facebook page or blog. 
Small teams of two or three students are also welcome. Applications are evaluated in two age classes: age between 11–14 and 15–18. The competition is open for visually impaired students as well. Their works are evaluated separately.
Prizes include participation in the Space Camp for free or for a reduced fee; science books and magazines; a visit to a selected space research institute or company; free one-year membership in the society.

Space Academy 
Hungarian Astronautical Society in collaboration with the international Space Generation Advisory Council initiated a yearly event called Space Academy in 2015 for university students and young professionals of the age between 18 and 35. .  It is a four-day workshop in August where the participants outline a solution for a given task or problem together. 
 2015: Voice of Youth – Which Way Now in the European Space Agency?
 2016: Design Experiment to the International Space Station!

Space Academy Club
Space Academy Club is a lecture series organized by the Hungarian Astronautical Society and the Hungarian organizers of Space Generation Advisory Council. It takes place usually in February, April, September and November, during university semesters. It targets primarily university students and young professionals of the age between 18 and 35. The series is connected with Space Academy in their name and their target groups.

Hungarian Space Studies Annuary (alias Space Brochure, Hun: Űrtan évkönyv)
MANT has been publishing its Astronautical Brochure since 1961, presenting the recent activities of MANT and summarizing the globally most significant affairs of space research. Hungarian researchers working in space research and its interdisciplinary fields present their latest results.

Space Research Day
Space Research Day is organized yearly. It joins the international World Space Week in October. It usually takes place at one of the universities of Budapest, or at the Hungarian Academy of Sciences. The program consists of lectures on actual space activities and space related results and exchange of views. There are blocks for professionals, interested amateurs and students.

Hungarian Space Research Forum (Ionosphere and Magnetosphere Physics Seminar) 
Hungarian Space Research Forum is a traditional biennial conference of researchers of the field, to be held for the 30th time in 2017. Its former title and now subtitle Ionosphere and Magnetosphere Physical Seminar expresses its original specialty which gained a broader horizon in the past decades.
Hungarian physicists, geophysicists, astronomers, meteorologists etc. take part in this seminar by presenting their latest researches through lectures and posters.

School Day
MANT is willing to provide lectures for schools in various fields related to space activities titled School Day. Every year our members give several lectures in Budapest and around the country in (mainly secondary) schools on fresh and exciting scientific topics like the last results on Mars exploration, development of equipments for spacecraft, planetary discoveries, etc.

Radio Connection between Students and Charles Simonyi on board of ISS [2007]
Dr. Charles Simonyi, the first repeat space tourist launched on April 7, 2007 (GMT), on board Soyuz TMA-10 to the International Space Station and returned on April 21, 2007, on his first space flight. The Hungarian-born Simonyi is a licensed amateur radio operator (KE7KDP) and he contacted students of Puskás Tivadar Távközlési Technikum (Puskás Tivadar Telecommunications Polytechnic, Budapest) on April 13. This occasion of radio contact was organized in collaboration with MANT.

Structure 
This structure is used since 2009 (as of April 2020):
 All-time honorary president: Prof. Dr. Almár, Iván
President 
Vice presidents
Secretary general
Deputies to secretary general
Administrative committee
Presidential Board
Audit Committee

Honorary members
 Almár, Iván
 Apáthy, István
 Bán, András
 Farkas, Bertalan
 Horváth, András
 Pap, László
 Simonyi, Charles 
 Solymosi, János
 Szabó, József
 Szalai, Sándor
 Abonyi, Ivánné (deceased)
 Bencze Pál (deceased)
 Detrekői Ákos (deceased)
 Gál Gyula (deceased) 
 Ponori Thewrewk Aurél (deceased) 
 Somogyi Antal (deceased)

Some well-known members of MANT (present or past)
 Almár, Iván astronomer 
 Detrekői, Ákos geodesist 
 Farkas, Bertalan flied astronaut
 Fonó, Albert engineer, inventor
 Gál, Gyula professor of space law
 Kulin, György astronomer 
 Magyari, Béla trained astronaut
 Ponori Thewrewk, Aurél astronomer 
 Simonyi, Charles "space tourist"

References

External links 
 Official site of Predecessor of MANT, TIT
 Scientific Lyceum
 Wikipedia page of TIT
 Detrekői Ákos
 In memoriam Gyula Gál the internationally acknowledged professor of space law
 Ponori Thewrewk Aurél astronomer
 Iván Almár, astronomer, lately working in SETI
 Bertalan Farkas, the first Hungarian flied cosmonaut
 Albert Fonó Inventor, working on turbojet and ramjet propulsion, first to patent a ramjet engine in 1928 
 György Kulin astronomer, discovered several minor planets
 Béla Magyari, Colonel of the Hungarian Air Force, trained cosmonaut

Astronomy in Hungary
Science and technology studies associations
Scientific organisations based in Hungary
Aerospace engineering organizations